Lai Wenguang (賴文光, 1827–1868), born in Mei County (now Meixian District), Guangdong, and later worked in Guangxi, was an eminent military leader of the Taiping Rebellion and Nian Rebellion, and known during his military tenure as the King of Zun (遵王) ("believe God"). He served under Hong Xiuquan's Taiping Administration, and was Hong Xiuquan's wife young brother. He led Taiping forces to many military victories. Lai became the leader of Eastern Nian Army in 1866. In June 1865, he commanded Nian cavalry forces of 90,000 in surrounding and attacking the  capital Beijing, nearly successfully. Lai surrendered to Qing forces on January 5, 1868. He was executed by Li Hongzhang after interrogation in February.

Lai Wenguang attracted many northern Chinese to unite fighting against the Qing government because people believed the Aisin Gioro had a secret agenda to stage a coup against Empress Dowager Cixi.
 
His elder brother Lai Hanying was the Taiping Rebellion's king early on, and one of the few of kings still alive after the civil war ended in 1870.  As a child, future revolutionary Sun Yat-sen often heard the story of the Taiping Rebellion.

References

《遵王賴文光自述》 (1868)

1868 deaths
Military leaders of the Taiping Rebellion
1827 births
Hakka generals
People from Meixian District
Executed Taiping Heavenly Kingdom people
People executed by the Qing dynasty
19th-century executions by China
Executed people from Guangdong
Nian Rebellion